Paolo Pietrangeli (29 April 1945 – 22 November 2021) was an Italian singer-songwriter, film director and screenwriter. He directed six films between 1975 and 2001. His 1977 film Pigs Have Wings was entered into the 27th Berlin International Film Festival.

He died on 22 November 2021, at the age of 76.

References

External links

 

1945 births
2021 deaths
Italian film directors
Italian male screenwriters
Italian screenwriters
Italian communists
People from Rome